The 2022 World Athletics Indoor Tour was the seventh edition of the World Athletics Indoor Tour, the highest series of international track and field indoor meetings.

The tour expanded in 2022 with the introduction of four tiers of competition labelled Gold, Silver, Bronze and Challenge in a mirror of the outdoor World Athletics Continental Tour comprising 36 meetings in Europe and North America. and retains seven gold standard events for 2022, five in Europe and two in the United States.

Meetings

Gold Tour Results

Men's track

Men's field

Women's track

Women's field

See also

References

World Athletics Indoor Tour
Indoor World Tour